= Arab League–Sudan relations =

- Arab League: Sudan

Arab League–Sudan relations refer to the political, economic, and cultural ties between the League of Arab States and the Republic of the Sudan.

== History ==
Sudan joined the Arab League on 19 January 1956 two weeks after independence from the United Kingdom and Egypt. South Sudan declared its independence from League member state Sudan in July 2011. A clause in the Charter of the Arab League accords the right of territories that have seceded from an Arab League member state to join the organization.
